Braemar is a village in Aberdeenshire, Scotland, located in the eastern Grampian Mountains.

Braemar may also refer to:
 Braemar, New South Wales, a village in Australia
 M/S Braemar or M/S Regina Baltica, a ferry
 MS Braemar, a 1993 cruise ship

See also
 Braemar Castle, a castle near Braemar, Scotland
 Braemar Gathering or Braemar Games, in Braemar, Scotland
 Braemar Hill, Hong Kong